North Pointe Preparatory is a public charter school located in Phoenix, Arizona, that serves students in grades 7 through 12.

History
North Pointe Preparatory was established in August 2001, with 130 students in grades 7 through 9. In eight years, it grew to its current maximum enrollment of 750 students in grades 7 through 12. The school was founded by four families who wanted a high school that would support parents as they built character and leadership qualities in their teens and be financially accessible to everyone. The Pointe Schools system also contains two elementary schools, Canyon Pointe Academy and Pinnacle Pointe Academy, which both opened in 2002.

Academics
North Pointe Preparatory focuses on academics, arts, and athletics, providing secondary education for students who intend to pursue a college education. North Pointe offers dual enrollment and advanced placement classes, which give students an opportunity to earn college credit while still in high school. It is one of only six public schools in Arizona accredited by the North Central Association of Colleges and Schools as a college preparatory school.

North Pointe Prep's Indoor Percussion team has only been competing for four years. In 2013 North Pointe Prep took second in WGAZ state championships, this being only their second year competing. In 2015, they took first in the WGAZ Division and state championship.

In 2015 Robotics has made it to the top ten in the state.

Athletics
The competitive cheer team at North Pointe competes within the 1A-3A region of the Arizona Interscholastic Association.  They are currently the four-time defending state champions, capturing the title from 2008 through 2011.  They have also won several  events in the last two years, including the 2009 West Coast Championship in the small coed division.

In 2012 the JH football team went undefeated and won the championship.

Community service
North Pointe's emphasis on community service is exemplified by its Prep Cares program.  In the fall, the school has collaborated with US Vets to create a float for the Phoenix Veterans Day Parade, in addition to running several other events honoring members of the armed forces.  North Pointe has a food drive every winter and helps stock boxes at local food banks. In the spring, Prep Cares focuses on providing mentoring for younger students, as well as working with the American Diabetes Association to help bring awareness to children's diabetes.

Controversies

2008 suspensions 
In the Spring of 2008, students had heard that a teacher was allegedly set to be fired for not changing the grades of a failing athlete. The students protested staged a peaceful sit-in during school hours. The students were told by school administrators and district personnel to return to their normal classes. After the students refused the directions, the school's administration responded by suspending over 30 students, as reported by local media later that evening. The school made a statement that said the teacher in question was not being dismissed as previously reported and that the students and media had been misinformed.

"WTF" shirts 
In the fall of 2013, the school released shirts which read "We're the Falcons" at the commencement of the School's Old School Spirit Week. The shirts drew attention immediately due to the fact that, in much larger font, the statement was abbreviated "WTF", an obscene phrase. The shirts were reported to the media by a parent who claimed her daughter had been dress coded for wearing a flower headband, although she had only been asked by a teacher to remove it during class and not officially dress coded.

Class of 2018 senior purge 
In September 2017, at the commencement of Old School Spirit Week, the morning announcements opened with the host bound, gagged, and being sprayed with water guns, to which she had previously consented. After the airing of an announcement inspired by "The Purge", the seniors then went around campus spraying other students. After the video was published to Facebook, some parents informed local news channels claiming the prank was in poor taste, with one even likening it to the Columbine massacre. One student was even reported to have sustained injury as an indirect result of slipping on water, although there were some reports that say he had attempted to wrestle a water gun away from one of the seniors. The school released a statement stating that the severity of what had occurred was being exaggerated, and that it was simply a joke.

References

External links
 Pointe Schools website

Public high schools in Arizona
Educational institutions established in 2001
High schools in Phoenix, Arizona
Charter schools in Arizona
2001 establishments in Arizona